"One I've Been Missing" is a song by British girl group Little Mix. It was released on November 22, 2019 by RCA UK, as the group's first official Christmas single and later became a contender for the UK Christmas number-one single. It was co written by Little Mix member Leigh-Anne Pinnock alongside Jez Ashurst, Rachel Furner, Sinéad Harnett, and Tre Jean-Marie. 

One I've been missing has been described as a 1950s inspired Ballad with a beautiful ode to festive love, with luscious harmonies. The song reached number four on the Belgium (Ultratip Flanders) charts and at number fourteen in Sweden. It charted within the top twenty on the Euro Digital Song and New Zealand Hot Singles charts. It reached number fifty nine on the UK Singles Chart, and charted in Ireland, Scotland, and on the US Holiday Digital Songs Charts. It was later added onto the expanded edition of their sixth studio album, Confetti as a bonus track.

Background
Although the song is the first Christmas-themed song by the group, they did release a "Christmas mix" of their 2015 single "Love Me Like You" and have performed covers of Christmas songs, like "Christmas (Baby Please Come Home)".

Promotion
Little Mix announced the song in a video posted to social media on 19 November 2019.

Track listing
Digital download and streaming
 "One I've Been Missing" – 3:12

Digital download and streaming – acoustic
 "One I've Been Missing"  – 3:02

Streaming – One I've Been Missing – EP
 "One I've Been Missing" – 3:12
 "One I've Been Missing"  – 3:02

Charts

Release history

References

2019 singles
2019 songs
Little Mix songs
Songs written by Jez Ashurst
Songs written by Tich (singer)
Songs written by Tre Jean-Marie